Dharna Chowk is an area where protests and strikes against governments take place in Hyderabad, India. It is located opposite to Indira Park.

History
Earlier, the place opposite to the Andhra Pradesh Secretariat was used for protests and strikes.

References

Tourist attractions in Hyderabad, India
General strikes in India
Squares in India